X44 (currently competing as X44 Vida Carbon Racing for sponsorship reasons) is an Extreme E racing team. The team was founded by seven-time Formula One World Champion, Lewis Hamilton, and takes part in the series that is highlighting the impacts of climate change.

History

In September 2020, Lewis Hamilton announced that he had founded his own team for the newly established racing series. The name "X44" was chosen due to Hamilton using the number on his Formula One car since 2014, when the drivers were able to choose their own numbers. In December 2020, X44 announced that Sébastien Loeb and Cristina Gutiérrez were signed as drivers for the team in the competitions first season. During the team's first season, they were the fastest qualifiers for each race and won one race. X44 finished the season in second place, behind champions Rosberg X Racing (run by Hamilton's former teammate Nico Rosberg).

Loeb and Gutiérrez returned for the 2022 season. In September 2022, X44 signed a title sponsorship deal with carbon credit investment firm Vida Carbon, and will be racing as X44 Vida Carbon Racing. X44 finished the season as champion, ahead of reigning champion Rosberg X Racing.

For the 2023 season, X44 entered a partnership with British single-seater team Rodin Carlin and signed Jamaican driver Fraser McConnell to replace Loeb, alongside the returning Gutiérrez.

Team results

Racing overview

Racing summary

Complete Extreme E results

(Races in bold indicate best qualifiers; races in italics indicate fastest super sector)

References

British auto racing teams
Auto racing teams established in 2020
 

Lewis Hamilton